The Museum of Liverpool Life was a Museum in Liverpool, England, part of National Museums Liverpool, that focused on the contribution that the people of Liverpool made to national life.  It closed in 2005 and was replaced by the Museum of Liverpool, which opened on 19 July 2011 and houses most of the original museum's exhibits.

Exhibitions
At the time of its closure on 4 June 2006, the museum had three galleries: City Lives explored Liverpool's cultural diversity, The River Room described life alongside the River Mersey and City Soldiers was an exhibition about the King's Regiment.

Previous exhibitions had been Mersey Culture, from Brookside to the Grand National, Making a Living and Demanding a Voice.

External links
Liverpool Museums

National Museums Liverpool
Defunct museums in England
Museums disestablished in 2006
2006 disestablishments in England